Heorhiy Korniyovych Kryuchkov (20 October 1929 – 4 November 2021) was a Soviet and Ukrainian politician. A member of the Communist Party of the Soviet Union and later the Communist Party of Ukraine, he served in the Verkhovna Rada from 1998 to 2006.

References

1929 births
2021 deaths
20th-century jurists
20th-century Ukrainian politicians
21st-century jurists
21st-century Ukrainian politicians
People from Zaporizhzhia Oblast
Communist Party of Ukraine politicians
Yaroslav Mudryi National Law University alumni
Third convocation members of the Verkhovna Rada
Fourth convocation members of the Verkhovna Rada

Ninth convocation members of the Verkhovna Rada of the Ukrainian Soviet Socialist Republic
Tenth convocation members of the Verkhovna Rada of the Ukrainian Soviet Socialist Republic
Eleventh convocation members of the Verkhovna Rada of the Ukrainian Soviet Socialist Republic
Recipients of the Order of Alexander Nevsky
Recipients of the Order of Friendship of Peoples
Recipients of the Order of Prince Yaroslav the Wise, 5th class
Recipients of the Order of the Red Banner of Labour
Soviet jurists
Soviet politicians
Ukrainian jurists
Ukrainian politicians